Royal Air Force Rivenhall or more simply RAF Rivenhall is a former Royal Air Force station located in Essex, England.

Opened in 1942, it was used by both the Royal Air Force and United States Army Air Forces.  During the war, it was used primarily as a combat airfield with various fighter and bomber units. After the war, it was closed in 1946 and kept in reserve until 1956.

Today, the remains of the airfield are located on private property with the northern half being turned into a quarry.

History

USAAF use
Rivenhall was known as USAAF Station AAF-168 for security reasons by the USAAF during the war, and by which it was referred to instead of location.  Its USAAF Station Code was "RL".

363d Fighter Group 
On 22 January 1944, a squadron of the 363d Fighter Group arrived from RAF Keevil where it had been awaiting equipment. The group had been selected as the third in the European Theatre to be equipped with the new North American P-51B Mustang.  The group consisted of the following operational squadrons:
 380th Fighter Squadron (A9)
 381st Fighter Squadron (B3)
 382d Fighter Squadron (C3)
  
On 14 April 1944, as part of a general movement of Ninth Air Force fighter units in the Colchester area to the advanced landing grounds, the 363d moved to RAF Staplehurst. The actual movement of all elements had begun two days previously.

397th Bombardment Group 
On the day following the departure of the 363d, the first Martin B-26 Marauders of the 397th Bombardment Group arrived from RAF Gosfield. The group consisted of the following operational squadrons:
 596th Bombardment Squadron (X2)
 597th Bombardment Squadron (9F)
 598th Bombardment Squadron (U2)
 599th Bombardment Squadron (6B)

The group's identification marking was a yellow diagonal band across both sides of the vertical stabiliser.

Early in August, officially on the 5th, the 397th transferred from Rivenhall to RAF Hurn in Hampshire, to give the Marauders a better radius of action as the break-out of the Allied forces from the Normandy beachhead meant that potential targets were receding.

RAF use

The following units were here at some point:
 No. 295 Squadron RAF (1944-46)
 No. 570 Squadron RAF (1944-45)
 No. 1677 (Target Towing) Flight RAF

Current use
Upon its release from military use, in June 1956, Marconi leased part of the airfield and within ten years had taken over most of the surviving buildings. Today, the northern half of the former airfield has been turned into a quarry, with the vast majority of the land in the northwest of the airfield being excavated.

The perimeter track of the airfield has been reduced to a single track agricultural road. However, some of the loop hardstands still remain in the southwestern quadrant of the field. All three runways either have been quarried, or substantially reduced in width, with agriculture fields taking over the grass areas of the former airfield. One T-2 hangar remains, along with a scattering of buildings. An automobile salvage yard has taken over some of the hardstands in the east end of the airfield, where once C-47s and gliders were stored. As of 2013, only one of the two T-2 hangars remain, with demolition claiming the other historical remaining buildings.

See also

List of former Royal Air Force stations

References

Citations

Bibliography

 Freeman, Roger A. (1994) UK Airfields of the Ninth: Then and Now 1994. After the Battle 
 Freeman, Roger A. (1996) The Ninth Air Force in Colour: UK and the Continent-World War Two. After the Battle 
 Maurer, Maurer (1983). Air Force Combat Units of World War II. Maxwell AFB, Alabama: Office of Air Force History. .
 USAAS-USAAC-USAAF-USAF Aircraft Serial Numbers—1908 to present

External links

 Rivenhall - A History of an Essex Airfield
 Rivenhall Airfield Pictures 2006

Airfields of the IX Fighter Command in the United Kingdom
Airfields of the 9th Bombardment Division in the United Kingdom
Military units and formations established in 1943
Royal Air Force stations in Essex
Royal Air Force stations of World War II in the United Kingdom